Lisa Ann Jacquin (born February 22, 1962) is an American equestrian and Olympic medalist. She was born in Tucson, Arizona. She won a silver medal in show jumping at the 1988 Summer Olympics in Seoul.

References

1962 births
Living people
American female equestrians
Olympic silver medalists for the United States in equestrian
Equestrians at the 1988 Summer Olympics
Equestrians at the 1992 Summer Olympics
Sportspeople from Tucson, Arizona
Medalists at the 1988 Summer Olympics
Pan American Games medalists in equestrian
Pan American Games silver medalists for the United States
Equestrians at the 1987 Pan American Games
Medalists at the 1987 Pan American Games
21st-century American women